Chris Sean Robinson (born April 2, 1974) is a retired American professional basketball player. He had a short National Basketball Association (NBA) career.

After graduating from Southwest Magnet High School in Macon, Georgia, Robinson attended Western Kentucky University where he averaged 13.8 points per game over four seasons.

He was selected by the Vancouver Grizzlies with the 51st overall pick in the 1996 NBA Draft. As a rookie for the Grizzlies, Robinson appeared in 41 games of the 1996–97 NBA season (six as a starter), averaging 4.6 points per game.

External links

1974 births
Living people
American expatriate basketball people in Belgium
American expatriate basketball people in Canada
American expatriate basketball people in France
American expatriate basketball people in Venezuela
American men's basketball players
Basketball players from Columbus, Georgia
Charleston Lowgators players
Gaiteros del Zulia players
Huntsville Flight players
La Crosse Bobcats players
RBC Pepinster players
Sacramento Kings players
Shooting guards
Sioux Falls Skyforce (CBA) players
SLUC Nancy Basket players
Vancouver Grizzlies draft picks
Vancouver Grizzlies players
Western Kentucky Hilltoppers basketball players